Atchison, Topeka and Santa Fe Railway No. 1010 is a 2-6-2 type steam locomotive built by the Baldwin Locomotive Works in 1901 for Atchison, Topeka and Santa Fe Railway. It started out as a Vauclain compound locomotive before it was rebuilt into a conventional locomotive in the 1910s. It was primarily used for various passenger trains across the Southwestern United States, including the record breaking 1905 Scott Special on the segment between Needles, California, and Seligman, Arizona, before it was reassigned to freight service in the 1940s. It was retired in 1955 and was kept by the Santa Fe for several years for preservation purposes. In 1979, Santa Fe donated No. 1010 to the California State Railroad Museum, where the locomotive resides there in Sacramento as of 2022.

History

Revenue service (1901-1954) 
No. 1010 was the eleventh member of the Atchison, Topeka and Santa Fe Railway's 1000 class, being built and delivered by the Baldwin Locomotive Works of Philadelphia, Pennsylvania in October 1901. The 1000 class was a series of 2-6-2 "Prairie" type locomotives, and although most other American-built 2-6-2s had an average driver diameter of forty-five to fifty-inches and were designed to pull short-distance freight trains, the 1000 class locomotives had a driver diameter of seventy-nine inches and were designed to pull mainline passenger trains. No. 1010 was initially constructed as a Vauclain compound high-pressure locomotive with four cylinders, since this design has proven to be popular with various class 1 railroads, and the 1000 class locomotives often ran over the 3% grades between Trinidad, Colorado and Raton, New Mexico, which was part of the La Junta-Albuquerque route.

In 1905, No. 1010 became famous for taking part in the record-breaking Scott Special train from Los Angeles, California to Chicago, Illinois, and  No. 1010 pulled the train from Needles, California to Seligman, Arizona. As the popularity of vauclain compound locomotives declined in the 1910s, the Santa Fe rebuilt their 2-6-2s with conventional cylinders, sixty-nine-inch diameter driving wheels, an oil tender, and superheaters to decrease operation costs. No. 1010 was subsequently reassigned to secondary commuter trains, since 4-6-2 "Pacific" types and 4-8-2 "Mountain" types have taken over mainline passenger service on the Santa Fe. By the end of the 1930s, No. 1010 became solely used in pulling short freight trains, and it had completed its final freight assignment in the Slaton Division in Texas in the early 1950s.

Preservation (1955-present) 
Since the locomotive became the last remaining locomotive to have taken part in the Scott Special, the Santa Fe chose to withhold No. 1010 for preservation. For the next decade, the Santa Fe used No. 1010 to take part multiple special events and television programs, including a "Railroad Day" event at South Pasadena in April 1958, and one 1964 General Electric commercial where the locomotive was painted bright red. By the early 1970s, the Santa Fe had put No. 1010 in storage on the garden tracks at the Redondo Junction roundhouse in Los Angeles along with a few other steam locomotives they had withheld from scrapping, including 0-4-0 No. 5. In 1974, Numbers 1010 and 5 were towed eastbound to Albuquerque for storage in the company roundhouse there. The Santa Fe had developed plans to construct their own vintage railroad museum within the city limits of Albuquerque, since they still owned some vintage steam and diesel locomotives to be preserved, but those plans never came to full fruition.

In November 1979, the Santa Fe instead donated Numbers 1010 and 5, along with most of their other remaining vintage locomotives, to the California State Railroad Museum (CSRM) in Sacramento, which was in its development phase at the time. Since the CSRM's grand opening in 1981, No. 1010 has remained on occasional display inside the museum's main hall. At some point in the 1990s, the CSRM moved the locomotive to their locomotive facility next to the Sacramento yard for storage, and they slowly maintained No. 1010 in the process. On May 18, 2018, No. 1010 was brought out of storage and moved back inside the CSRM's main hall for a limited time exhibit dubbed the "Death Valley Scotty’s Race for Glory" as another commemoration for the Scott Special. As of 2022, No. 1010 remains on occasional display at the CSRM on selective days, while remaining in storage for the rest of its time.

Film history 

 In 1955, No. 1010 was fired up by the Santa Fe for the final time for a television re-enactment of the Scott Special for the "Death Valley Days" program about the special train. This locomotive was also prominently featured in a 1958 episode of the TV series Sky King, entitled "Stop That Train".

References

Further reading 
 
 
  (The Warbonnet is the official journal of the Santa Fe Railway Historical and Modeling Society)

2-6-2 locomotives
Baldwin locomotives
1010
Railway locomotives introduced in 1901
Individual locomotives of the United States
Standard gauge locomotives of the United States
Preserved steam locomotives of California